Eight Corners is an unincorporated community in the town of Sigel, Wood County, Wisconsin, United States.

Eight Corners originally was built up at an eight-pointed intersection, hence the name.

Notes

Unincorporated communities in Wood County, Wisconsin
Unincorporated communities in Wisconsin